KRMR may refer to:

 KRMR (FM), a radio station (93.3 FM) licensed to serve Russian Mission, Alaska, United States
 KMDG, a radio station (105.7 FM) licensed to serve Hays, Kansas, United States, which held the call sign KRMR from 2008 to 2020